The calculus of variations (or Variational Calculus) is a field of mathematical analysis that uses variations, which are small changes in functions
and functionals, to find maxima and minima of functionals: mappings from a set of functions to the real numbers. Functionals are often expressed as definite integrals involving functions and their derivatives. Functions that maximize or minimize functionals may be found using the Euler–Lagrange equation of the calculus of variations.

A simple example of such a problem is to find the curve of shortest length connecting two points. If there are no constraints, the solution is a straight line between the points. However, if the curve is constrained to lie on a surface in space, then the solution is less obvious, and possibly many solutions may exist. Such solutions are known as geodesics. A related problem is posed by Fermat's principle: light follows the path of shortest optical length connecting two points, which depends upon the material of the medium. One corresponding concept in mechanics is the principle of least/stationary action.

Many important problems involve functions of several variables. Solutions of boundary value problems for the Laplace equation satisfy the Dirichlet's principle. Plateau's problem requires finding a surface of minimal area that spans a given contour in space: a solution can often be found by dipping a frame in soapy water. Although such experiments are relatively easy to perform, their mathematical formulation is far from simple: there may be more than one locally minimizing surface, and they may have non-trivial topology.

History 

The calculus of variations may be said to begin with Newton's minimal resistance problem in 1687, followed by the brachistochrone curve problem raised by Johann Bernoulli (1696). It immediately occupied the attention of Jakob Bernoulli and the Marquis de l'Hôpital, but  Leonhard Euler first elaborated the subject, beginning in 1733. Lagrange was influenced by Euler's work to contribute significantly to the theory. After Euler saw the 1755 work of the 19-year-old Lagrange, Euler dropped his own partly geometric approach in favor of Lagrange's purely analytic approach and renamed the subject the calculus of variations in his 1756 lecture Elementa Calculi Variationum.

Legendre (1786) laid down a method, not entirely satisfactory, for the discrimination of maxima and minima. Isaac Newton and Gottfried Leibniz also gave some early attention to the subject. To this discrimination Vincenzo Brunacci (1810), Carl Friedrich Gauss (1829), Siméon Poisson (1831), Mikhail Ostrogradsky (1834), and Carl Jacobi (1837) have been among the contributors. An important general work is that of Sarrus (1842) which was condensed and improved by Cauchy (1844). Other valuable treatises and memoirs have been written by Strauch (1849), Jellett (1850), Otto Hesse (1857), Alfred Clebsch (1858), and Lewis Buffett Carll (1885), but perhaps the most important work of the century is that of Weierstrass. His celebrated course on the theory is epoch-making, and it may be asserted that he was the first to place it on a firm and unquestionable foundation. The 20th and the 23rd Hilbert problem published in 1900 encouraged further development.

In the 20th century David Hilbert, Oskar Bolza, Gilbert Ames Bliss, Emmy Noether, Leonida Tonelli, Henri Lebesgue and Jacques Hadamard among others made significant contributions. Marston Morse applied calculus of variations in what is now called Morse theory. Lev Pontryagin, Ralph Rockafellar and F. H. Clarke developed new mathematical tools for the calculus of variations in optimal control theory. The dynamic programming of Richard Bellman is an alternative to the calculus of variations.

Extrema 

The calculus of variations is concerned with the maxima or minima (collectively called extrema) of functionals. A functional maps functions to scalars, so functionals have been described as "functions of functions." Functionals have extrema with respect to the elements  of a given function space defined over a given domain. A functional  is said to have an extremum at the function  if  has the same sign for all  in an arbitrarily small neighborhood of  The function  is called an extremal function or extremal. For a function space of continuous functions, extrema of corresponding functionals are called strong extrema or weak extrema, depending on whether the first derivatives of the continuous functions are respectively all continuous or not.

Both strong and weak extrema of functionals are for a space of continuous functions but strong extrema have the additional requirement that the first derivatives of the functions in the space be continuous. Thus a strong extremum is also a weak extremum, but the converse may not hold.  Finding strong extrema is more difficult than finding weak extrema. An example of a necessary condition that is used for finding weak extrema is the Euler–Lagrange equation.

Euler–Lagrange equation 

Finding the extrema of functionals is similar to finding the maxima and minima of functions. The maxima and minima of a function may be located by finding the points where its derivative vanishes (i.e., is equal to zero).  The extrema of functionals may be obtained by finding functions for which the functional derivative is equal to zero. This leads to solving the associated Euler–Lagrange equation.

Consider the functional

where
 are constants,
 is twice continuously differentiable,

 is twice continuously differentiable with respect to its arguments  and 

The term  is called the variation of the function  and is denoted by 

and because  and 

Therefore,

where  when  and we have used integration by parts on the second term. Also, as previously mentioned the left side of the equation is zero so that

According to the fundamental lemma of calculus of variations, the part of the integrand in parentheses is zero, i.e.

which is called the Euler–Lagrange equation.

In general this gives a second-order ordinary differential equation which can be solved to obtain the extremal function   The Euler–Lagrange equation is a necessary, but not sufficient, condition for an extremum   A sufficient condition for a minimum is given in the section Variations and sufficient condition for a minimum.

Example 
In order to illustrate this process, consider the problem of finding the extremal function  which is the shortest curve that connects two points  and  The arc length of the curve is given by

with

Note that assuming  is a function of  loses generality; ideally both should be a function of some other parameter. This approach is good solely for instructive purposes.

The Euler–Lagrange equation will now be used to find the extremal function  that minimizes the functional 

with

Since  does not appear explicitly in  the first term in the Euler–Lagrange equation vanishes for all  and thus,

Thus

for some constant  Then

where

Solving, we get

which implies that

and we have thus found the extremal function  that minimizes the functional  so that  is a minimum. The equation for a straight line is  In other words, the shortest distance between two points is a straight line.

Beltrami's identity 
In that case, the Euler–Lagrange equation can be simplified to the Beltrami identity

where  is a constant.

The intuition behind this result is that, if the variable  is actually time, then the statement  implies that the Lagrangian is time-independent. By Noether's theorem, there is an associated conserved quantity. In this case, this quantity is the Hamiltonian, the Legendre transform of the Lagrangian, which (often) coincides with the energy of the system. This is (minus) the constant in Beltrami's identity.

Euler–Poisson equation 
If  depends on higher-derivatives of  that is, if  then  must satisfy the Euler–Poisson equation,

Du Bois-Reymond's theorem 

The discussion thus far has assumed that extremal functions possess two continuous derivatives, although the existence of the integral  requires only first derivatives of trial functions. The condition that the first variation vanishes at an extremal may be regarded as a weak form of the Euler–Lagrange equation. The theorem of Du Bois-Reymond asserts that this weak form implies the strong form. If  has continuous first and second derivatives with respect to all of its arguments, and if

then  has two continuous derivatives, and it satisfies the Euler–Lagrange equation.

Lavrentiev phenomenon 

Hilbert was the first to give good conditions for the Euler–Lagrange equations to give a stationary solution. Within a convex area and a positive thrice differentiable Lagrangian the solutions are composed of a countable collection of sections that either go along the boundary or satisfy the Euler–Lagrange equations in the interior.

However Lavrentiev in 1926 showed that there are circumstances where there is no optimum solution but one can be approached arbitrarily closely by increasing numbers of sections. The Lavrentiev Phenomenon identifies a difference in the infimum of a minimization problem across different classes of admissible functions. For instance the following problem, presented by Manià in 1934:

Clearly, minimizes the functional, but we find any function  gives a value bounded away from the infimum.

Connected with the Lavrentiev Phenomenon is the repulsion property: any functional displaying Lavrentiev's Phenomenon will display the weak repulsion property.

Functions of several variables 

For example, if  denotes the displacement of a membrane above the domain  in the  plane, then its potential energy is proportional to its surface area:

The Euler–Lagrange equation for this problem is nonlinear:

See Courant (1950) for details.

Dirichlet's principle 
It is often sufficient to consider only small displacements of the membrane, whose energy difference from no displacement is approximated by

Provided that u has two derivatives, we may apply the divergence theorem to obtain

for all smooth functions v that vanish on the boundary of  The proof for the case of one dimensional integrals may be adapted to this case to show that
in 

The difficulty with this reasoning is the assumption that the minimizing function u must have two derivatives. Riemann argued that the existence of a smooth minimizing function was assured by the connection with the physical problem: membranes do indeed assume configurations with minimal potential energy. Riemann named this idea the Dirichlet principle in honor of his teacher Peter Gustav Lejeune Dirichlet. However Weierstrass gave an example of a variational problem with no solution: minimize

among all functions  that satisfy  and 
 can be made arbitrarily small by choosing piecewise linear functions that make a transition between −1 and 1 in a small neighborhood of the origin. However, there is no function that makes  Eventually it was shown that Dirichlet's principle is valid, but it requires a sophisticated application of the regularity theory for elliptic partial differential equations; see Jost and Li–Jost (1998).

Generalization to other boundary value problems 
A more general expression for the potential energy of a membrane is

If we apply the divergence theorem, the result is

If we first set  on  the boundary integral vanishes, and we conclude as before that

in  Then if we allow  to assume arbitrary boundary values, this implies that  must satisfy the boundary condition

on  This boundary condition is a consequence of the minimizing property of : it is not imposed beforehand. Such conditions are called natural boundary conditions.

The preceding reasoning is not valid if  vanishes identically on  In such a case, we could allow a trial function  where  is a constant. For such a trial function,

By appropriate choice of   can assume any value unless the quantity inside the brackets vanishes. Therefore, the variational problem is meaningless unless

This condition implies that net external forces on the system are in equilibrium. If these forces are in equilibrium, then the variational problem has a solution, but it is not unique, since an arbitrary constant may be added. Further details and examples are in Courant and Hilbert (1953).

Eigenvalue problems 

Both one-dimensional and multi-dimensional eigenvalue problems can be formulated as variational problems.

Sturm–Liouville problems 

The Sturm–Liouville eigenvalue problem involves a general quadratic form

where is restricted to functions that satisfy the boundary conditions

Let  be a normalization integral

The primary variational problem is to minimize the ratio  among all  satisfying the endpoint conditions. It is shown below that the Euler–Lagrange equation for the minimizing  is

where  is the quotient

It can be shown (see Gelfand and Fomin 1963) that the minimizing  has two derivatives and satisfies the Euler–Lagrange equation. The associated minimizing function will be denoted by  This variational characterization of eigenvalues leads to the Rayleigh–Ritz method: choose an approximating  as a linear combination of basis functions (for example trigonometric functions) and carry out a finite-dimensional minimization among such linear combinations. This method is often surprisingly accurate.

The next smallest eigenvalue and eigenfunction can be obtained by minimizing  under the additional constraint

This procedure can be extended to obtain the complete sequence of eigenvalues and eigenfunctions for the problem.

The variational problem also applies to more general boundary conditions. Instead of requiring that  vanish at the endpoints, we may not impose any condition at the endpoints, and set

If we set the first variation for the ratio  is

where λ is given by the ratio  as previously.
After integration by parts,

If we first require that  vanish at the endpoints, the first variation will vanish for all such  only if

If  satisfies this condition, then the first variation will vanish for arbitrary  only if

These latter conditions are the natural boundary conditions for this problem, since they are not imposed on trial functions for the minimization, but are instead a consequence of the minimization.

Eigenvalue problems in several dimensions 
Eigenvalue problems in higher dimensions are defined in analogy with the one-dimensional case. For example, given a domain  with boundary  in three dimensions we may define

and

Let  be the function that minimizes the quotient 

where

The minimizing  must also satisfy the natural boundary condition

on the boundary  This result depends upon the regularity theory for elliptic partial differential equations; see Jost and Li–Jost (1998) for details. Many extensions, including completeness results, asymptotic properties of the eigenvalues and results concerning the nodes of the eigenfunctions are in Courant and Hilbert (1953).

Applications

Optics 
Fermat's principle states that light takes a path that (locally) minimizes the optical length between its endpoints. If the -coordinate is chosen as the parameter along the path, and  along the path, then the optical length is given by

where the refractive index  depends upon the material.

After integration by parts of the first term within brackets, we obtain the Euler–Lagrange equation

The light rays may be determined by integrating this equation. This formalism is used in the context of Lagrangian optics and Hamiltonian optics.

Snell's law 
There is a discontinuity of the refractive index when light enters or leaves a lens. Let

At the   must be continuous, but  may be discontinuous. After integration by parts in the separate regions and using the Euler–Lagrange equations, the first variation takes the form

The factor multiplying  is the sine of angle of the incident ray with the  axis, and the factor multiplying  is the sine of angle of the refracted ray with the  axis.  Snell's law for refraction requires that these terms be equal. As this calculation demonstrates, Snell's law is equivalent to vanishing of the first variation of the optical path length.

Fermat's principle in three dimensions 
It is expedient to use vector notation: let  let  be a parameter,  let  be the parametric representation of a curve  and let  be its tangent vector. The optical length of the curve is given by

Note that this integral is invariant with respect to changes in the parametric representation of  The Euler–Lagrange equations for a minimizing curve have the symmetric form

where

It follows from the definition that  satisfies

Therefore, the integral may also be written as

Thus the problem of studying the curves that make the integral stationary can be related to the study of the level surfaces of In order to find such a function, we turn to the wave equation, which governs the propagation of light. This formalism is used in the context of Lagrangian optics and Hamiltonian optics.

Connection with the wave equation 
The wave equation for an inhomogeneous medium is

where  is the velocity, which generally depends upon  Wave fronts for light are characteristic surfaces for this partial differential equation: they satisfy

We may look for solutions in the form

In that case,  satisfies

where  According to the theory of first-order partial differential equations, if  then  satisfies

along a system of curves (the light rays) that are given by

These equations for solution of a first-order partial differential equation are identical to the Euler–Lagrange equations if we make the identification

We conclude that the function  is the value of the minimizing integral  as a function of the upper end point. That is, when a family of minimizing curves is constructed, the values of the optical length satisfy the characteristic equation corresponding the wave equation. Hence, solving the associated partial differential equation of first order is equivalent to finding families of solutions of the variational problem. This is the essential content of the Hamilton–Jacobi theory, which applies to more general variational problems.

Mechanics 

In classical mechanics, the action,  is defined as the time integral of the Lagrangian,   The Lagrangian is the difference of energies,

where  is the kinetic energy of a mechanical system and  its potential energy. Hamilton's principle (or the action principle) states that the motion of a conservative holonomic (integrable constraints) mechanical system is such that the action integral

is stationary with respect to variations in the path 
The Euler–Lagrange equations for this system are known as Lagrange's equations:

and they are equivalent to Newton's equations of motion (for such systems).

The conjugate momenta  are defined by

For example, if

then 

The Hamiltonian is the total energy of the system: 
Analogy with Fermat's principle suggests that solutions of Lagrange's equations (the particle trajectories) may be described in terms of level surfaces of some function of  This function is a solution of the Hamilton–Jacobi equation:

Further applications 

Further applications of the calculus of variations include the following:

 The derivation of the catenary shape
 Solution to Newton's minimal resistance problem
 Solution to the brachistochrone problem
 Solution to the tautochrone problem
 Solution to isoperimetric problems
 Calculating geodesics
 Finding minimal surfaces and solving Plateau's problem
 Optimal control
 Analytical mechanics, or reformulations of Newton's laws of motion, most notably Lagrangian and Hamiltonian mechanics;
 Geometric optics, especially Lagrangian and Hamiltonian optics;
 Variational method (quantum mechanics), one way of finding approximations to the lowest energy eigenstate or ground state, and some excited states;
 Variational Bayesian methods, a family of techniques for approximating intractable integrals arising in Bayesian inference and machine learning;
 Variational methods in general relativity, a family of techniques using calculus of variations to solve problems in Einstein's general theory of relativity;
 Finite element method is a variational method for finding numerical solutions to boundary-value problems in differential equations;
 Total variation denoising, an image processing method for filtering high variance or noisy signals.

Variations and sufficient condition for a minimum 

Calculus of variations is concerned with variations of functionals, which are small changes in the functional's value due to small changes in the function that is its argument.  The first variation is defined as the linear part of the change in the functional, and the second variation is defined as the quadratic part.

The functional  is said to be differentiable if

The functional  is said to be twice differentiable if

The second variation  is said to be strongly positive if

for all  and for some constant .

Using the above definitions, especially the definitions of first variation, second variation, and strongly positive, the following sufficient condition for a minimum of a functional can be stated.

See also 

 First variation
 Isoperimetric inequality
 Variational principle
 Variational bicomplex
 Fermat's principle
 Principle of least action
 Infinite-dimensional optimization
 Finite element method
 Functional analysis
 Ekeland's variational principle
 Inverse problem for Lagrangian mechanics
 Obstacle problem
 Perturbation methods
 Young measure
 Optimal control
 Direct method in calculus of variations
 Noether's theorem
 De Donder–Weyl theory
 Variational Bayesian methods
 Chaplygin problem
 Nehari manifold
 Hu–Washizu principle
 Luke's variational principle
 Mountain pass theorem
 
 Measures of central tendency as solutions to variational problems
 Stampacchia Medal
 Fermat Prize
 Convenient vector space

Notes

References

Further reading 
 Benesova, B. and Kruzik, M.: "Weak Lower Semicontinuity of Integral Functionals and Applications". SIAM Review  59(4) (2017), 703–766.
 Bolza, O.: Lectures on the Calculus of Variations. Chelsea Publishing Company, 1904, available on Digital Mathematics library. 2nd edition republished in 1961, paperback in 2005, .
 Cassel, Kevin W.: Variational Methods with Applications in Science and Engineering, Cambridge University Press, 2013.
 Clegg, J.C.: Calculus of Variations, Interscience Publishers Inc., 1968.
 Courant, R.: Dirichlet's principle, conformal mapping and minimal surfaces. Interscience, 1950.
 Dacorogna, Bernard: "Introduction" Introduction to the Calculus of Variations, 3rd edition. 2014, World Scientific Publishing, .
 Elsgolc, L.E.: Calculus of Variations, Pergamon Press Ltd., 1962.
 Forsyth, A.R.: Calculus of Variations, Dover, 1960.
 Fox, Charles: An Introduction to the Calculus of Variations, Dover Publ., 1987.
 Giaquinta, Mariano; Hildebrandt, Stefan: Calculus of Variations  I and II, Springer-Verlag,  and 
 Jost, J. and X. Li-Jost: Calculus of Variations. Cambridge University Press, 1998.
 Lebedev, L.P. and Cloud, M.J.: The Calculus of Variations and Functional Analysis with Optimal Control and Applications in Mechanics, World Scientific, 2003, pages 1–98.
 Logan, J. David: Applied Mathematics, 3rd edition. Wiley-Interscience, 2006
 
 Roubicek, T.: "Calculus of variations". Chap.17 in: Mathematical Tools for Physicists. (Ed. M. Grinfeld) J. Wiley, Weinheim, 2014, pp. 551–588.
 Sagan, Hans: Introduction to the Calculus of Variations, Dover, 1992.
 Weinstock, Robert: Calculus of Variations with Applications to Physics and Engineering, Dover, 1974 (reprint of 1952 ed.).

External links 
 Variational calculus. Encyclopedia of Mathematics.
 calculus of variations. PlanetMath.
 Calculus of Variations. MathWorld.
 Calculus of variations. Example problems.
 Mathematics - Calculus of Variations and Integral Equations. Lectures on YouTube.
 Selected papers on Geodesic Fields. Part I, Part II.

 
Optimization in vector spaces